A paper clip is a paper fastener.

Paper clip may also refer to:

 "Paper Clip", an episode of The X-Files
 Paper Clips Project, a monument honoring the Holocaust victims
 Paper Clips (film), a 2004 documentary about the project
 PaperClip, a 1980s word processor for the Commodore 64 and Atari 8-bit family
 Microsoft Paperclip, the default Microsoft Office Assistant
 Operation Paperclip, codename for the U.S. intelligence plan to extract scientists from Germany during World War II

See also
 One red paperclip, trading experiment
 Paperclip maximizer, Nick Bostrom's thought experiment about existential risk of artificial intelligence
 Universal Paperclips, a 2017 incremental game using the concept of the paperclip maximizer